Wāli, Wā'lī or vali (from  Wālī) is an administrative title that was used in the Muslim World (including the Caliphate and Ottoman Empire) to designate governors of administrative divisions. It is still in use in some countries influenced by Arab or Muslim culture. The division that a Wāli governs is called Wilayah, or in the case of Ottoman Turkey, "Vilayet".

The title currently also refers to the ceremonial head of the Bangsamoro, a Muslim-majority autonomous region of the Philippines.

Algerian term 
In Algeria, a wāli is the "governor" and administrative head of each of the 58 provinces of the country, and is chosen by the president.

Iranian term 

In Iran the term is known as Vāli and refers to the governor-general or local lord of an important province. During the Safavid reign 1501-1722 the former rulers of the then subordinated provinces of the Georgian Kartli and Kakheti kingdom, the Kurdish emirate of Ardalan, the chiefs of Lorestān Province and of Khuzestan Province in western Iran were regarded as hereditary governor-generals titled Vāli equal to the Beylerbeylik (Safavid Persia). These "lords of the marches" should protect Iran's western borders against foreign powers. During the Qajar rule 1785-1925 the kingdom of Georgia was lost to Russia and the hereditary lords were replaced by officials of the central power. Mainly these officials came from the group of imperial princes and royal notables and were made Vāli of important provinces. For example, the crown prince bore traditionally the title of Vāli of Azerbaijan (Iran).

Ottoman Empire term 
"Vali" (translated as "gouverneur-général" in French, such as in the Ottoman constitution) was the title in the Ottoman Empire of the most common type of Ottoman governor, in charge of a vilayet (in Ottoman Turkish), often a military officer such as a pasha; see Subdivisions of the Ottoman Empire. The form used in some parts of the empire was Wali.

Omani Sultanate term 
The Sultanate of Oman, when it ruled Mombasa, Kenya, appointed a wali for the city known locally as LiWali. The term is still used today to denote settlements of Oman, such as the Wilayat Madha, a settlement which intersects the road between Madam in Sharjah and Hatta in Dubai in the United Arab Emirates (UAE). Many Rulers of the Trucial States (also called Trucial Oman in the past) appointed walis to look after towns on their behalf, including employing slaves for that purpose.

Moroccan term 
Since 1997 regionalisation reform, a Wāli is the governor of one of the twelve regions of Morocco.

Pakistani term 
In Pakistan, the rulers of the former princely state of Swat were given the title of Wali.

Philippine term 

In the Philippines, the term Wa'lī is the name for the titular head of Bangsamoro Autonomous Region in Muslim Mindanao, an autonomous region in the large southern island of Mindanao.  The Wa'lī have ceremonial functions and powers such as moral guardianship of the territory and convocation and dissolution of its parliament.

Tunisian term 
In Tunisia, a wāli is the "governor" and administrative head of each of the 24 provinces of the country, and is chosen by the president.

Turkish term 
In Turkey a Vali is a provincial governor of one of the 81 Turkish provinces. He is nominated by the interior minister and appointed by the president. A Vali supervises the functioning of the state functions such as security and maintenance and oversees also the elected provincial and municipal councils. During the OHAL State of emergency from 1987 to 2002, there existed a so called Super Vali who oversaw the Valis of up to 13 provinces in southeast Anatolia.

See also
Governor
Governor-general

Notes

References

Arabic words and phrases
Gubernatorial titles
Civil servants from the Ottoman Empire
Egyptian royal titles
Ottoman titles
Titles in Afghanistan
Titles in Bangladesh
Titles in Pakistan
Titles in Algeria
Titles in Iran
Turkish titles
Titles in Bosnia and Herzegovina during Ottoman period